"The Stand In" is the 80th episode of the NBC sitcom Seinfeld. This was the 16th episode of the fifth season. It aired on February 24, 1994. In this episode, Jerry struggles to get a hospitalized friend to laugh, George persists in dating a woman he doesn't like to avoid being perceived as unable to commit, and Kramer encourages his friend Mickey Abbott to wear lifts in order to keep his job as a stand-in.

Plot
Riding on a bus, Jerry and George meet a friend, Al Netche, who tells them another friend, Fulton, is in the hospital, and has asked Jerry to visit him as he "needs a good laugh." Jerry visits Fulton and tells a story about a guy named "Pachyderm" juggling hot pizza slices, but Fulton never laughs.

George has nothing to talk about with his girlfriend, Daphne, and wants to break up. Daphne tells George that Al advised her to end the relationship as George doesn't commit and will end up hurting her. George postpones the breakup in order to prove Al wrong.

Kramer gets a job as a stand-in in the series All My Children, along with his friend Mickey Abbott, a little person. Mickey is worried about keeping his job as the child actor he stands in for is going through a growth spurt. Kramer suggests Mickey use lifts to increase his height. Mickey reluctantly agrees.

Jerry sets up a date for Elaine with his friend, Phil Totola. The date is ruined when Phil abruptly flashes his genitals. When he bumps into Phil at the hospital, Jerry drops hints that such exposure is offensive, but they seemingly go over Phil's head.

Mickey plans to date Tammy, a little woman. Johnny Bigiano, another little person stand-in who envies Mickey, breaks into Mickey's locker and finds the lifts. Mickey is ostracized by the other little people. As Tammy leaves with Johnny, Mickey angrily attacks Kramer.

Jerry feels added pressure to be funny after his visit to the hospital coincides with a deterioration in Fulton's condition. He offers to do his act with new material. Jerry is so funny that Fulton dies from laughter. To George's relief, Daphne says that she met another person: Jerry Persach, nicknamed "Pachyderm.”

Production
Larry David got the idea for the Mickey Abbott plot when he noticed how many little people worked as stand-ins for child actors (little people are preferred over children as stand-ins because children cannot legally work as many hours a day as adults). Michael Richards recalled being immediately excited by his work with Danny Woodburn, the actor who plays Mickey, due to the chemistry between their two characters. In the scene where Mickey attacks a seated Kramer, Richards wore a back brace and padding so that he could take a full fall without injury.

A man exposing his penis on a date was drawn from a real date staff writer Carol Leifer had.

Reception
David Sims of The A.V. Club gave the episode a B grade saying: "[The episode] is not a great episode, especially considering Larry David wrote it, but it's got some very impressive touches, and Phil Totola's dick move (pardon the pun) is one of them".

References

External links 

Seinfeld (season 5) episodes
1994 American television episodes
Television episodes written by Larry David